Walter Mortimer Mirisch (November 8, 1921 – February 24, 2023) was an American film producer. He was the president and executive head of production of The Mirisch Corporation, an independent film production company which he formed in 1957 with his brother, Marvin, and half-brother, Harold. He won the Academy Award for Best Picture as producer of In the Heat of the Night (1967).

Life and career

Early years 
Born to a Jewish family in New York, Mirisch was the youngest of three sons born to Josephine Frances (née Urbach) and Max Mirisch. His siblings included film producer Marvin. His father emigrated from Kraków, Poland in 1891 at the age of 17, arriving in New York City where he worked as a tailor. His mother was the daughter of immigrants from Hungary and Poland. His father was previously married to Flora Glasshut with whom he had two sons; she died of cancer at the age of 40. Walter Mirisch graduated from DeWitt Clinton High School. He was a summer vacation usher in Jersey City's State Theater, his first job associated with the movie business. He soon moved up to higher positions at other theaters.

A heart murmur kept him from joining the Navy, but Mirisch was still eager to serve his country during World War II. He moved to Burbank, California, to work at a bomber-plane plant, where he wrote technical articles, sharing knowledge with other military manufacturers. After the war ended Mirisch immediately turned his attention back to his original passion, the movies. In 1942, he received a BA degree from the University of Wisconsin–Madison and the next year he graduated from Harvard's Graduate School of Business Administration. He produced his first film, Fall Guy (1947), for Monogram Pictures.

Career 
At the age of 29, Mirisch became production head at Allied Artists Studio, initially only a division of Monogram, with some 30 films to oversee. During his tenure, he found time to personally produce Flat Top (1952), Wichita (1955), which received a Golden Globe Award from the Hollywood Foreign Press Association as Best Outdoor Drama of 1955, The First Texan (1956), and An Annapolis Story (1955). Among other films, he supervised the productions of Invasion of the Body Snatchers, Friendly Persuasion (both 1956), and the Billy Wilder-directed Love in the Afternoon (1957).

Mirisch headed that category of creative producers who learned their craft thoroughly from the very inception of a project through all phases of its production process. Known in the industry as a perfectionist, he supervised every detail of his films from the earliest stages to the final release.

The Mirisch Company was founded in 1957. It produced 68 films for United Artists, including three that won the Academy Award for Best Picture, namely The Apartment (1960), West Side Story (1961) and In the Heat of the Night (1967), which also won four other Oscars. Among the most noteworthy Mirisch projects that Walter personally produced are: Man of the West (1958); The Magnificent Seven (1960); Two for the Seesaw (1962); Toys in the Attic (1963); the film version of James A. Michener's monumental novel, Hawaii (1966), which was nominated for seven Oscars, and its sequel, The Hawaiians (1970); Midway (1976), the saga of America's greatest naval victory; the tender and moving Same Time, Next Year (1978); and Romantic Comedy (1983).

For the NBC television network, Mirisch was executive producer of Wichita Town with Joel McCrea (1959–1960), Peter Loves Mary (1960–1961), Desperado; Return of Desperado; Desperado: Avalanche At Devil’s Ridge; Desperado: Legacy; Desperado: Sole Survivor; and in 1993, Troubleshooters: Trapped Beneath The Earth. Mirisch was executive producer of Lily in Winter for the USA Network in 1994, A Class for Life for ABC in 1995, as well as The Magnificent Seven, a weekly series for CBS in 1997.

Ron Howard said of Mirisch, "From Bomba, the Jungle Boy to Some Like It Hot and In the Heat of the Night ... Walter Mirisch produced many of the films which dazzled and inspired me (and I'm not kidding about Bomba. I loved those movies as a kid). When I later acted in one of his (lesser) productions, The Spikes Gang, I learned that a prolific and brilliant producer could also be a terrific guy and a wonderful teacher."

Honors and awards 
Mirisch received the 1967 Academy Award for Best Picture for his production of In the Heat of the Night.

Throughout the years he was the recipient of numerous awards and honors, including The Producer of the Year Award: first, from the Producers' Guild of America (1967); later, the National Association of Theatre Owners (1972); and then ShowaRama (1975).

In addition, he received the Cecil B. DeMille Award of the Hollywood Foreign Press Association for "outstanding contribution to the entertainment field" (1976), the Irving G. Thalberg Memorial Award of the Academy of Motion Picture Arts and Sciences for his "consistently high quality of motion picture production (1978), and the Academy's Jean Hersholt Humanitarian Award, which is given to an individual whose "humanitarian efforts have brought credit to the industry" (1983).

Mirisch served three terms as president of the Producers Guild of America. He served four terms as President of the Academy of Motion Picture Arts and Sciences. He was a former president and Governor of the Performing Arts Council of the Los Angeles Music Center, as well as a trustee of the Motion Picture and Television Fund. Mirisch was also an Emeritus member of the board of directors of Cedars-Sinai Medical Center of Los Angeles, and the board of directors of the UCLA Foundation.

He was decorated by the Republic of France with its Order of Arts and Letters in 1961.

In May 1989, he received an honorary doctorate in Humane Letters from the University of Wisconsin–Madison. In June 1989, he was the recipient of the UCLA Medal, the university's highest award.

In 2004, he was honored with a retrospective at the Los Angeles County Museum of Art entitled "The Magnificent Mirisches". The Museum of Modern Art (MoMA) in New York honored him in 2006 with a retrospective of twelve films.

On February 2, 2008, Mirisch presented the Darryl F. Zanuck Producer of the Year award at the 19th Annual Producers Guild of America Awards. The top honor (the equivalent of the Academy Award for Best Picture) went to Scott Rudin, Joel and Ethan Coen for No Country for Old Men.

Personal life and death 
Mirisch was married to Patricia Kahan (1924–2005); they had three children, Anne Mirisch Sonnenberg, Andrew Mirisch, and Lawrence Mirisch. His son, Lawrence, is the founder of the Mirisch Agency. 

Mirisch turned 100 on November 8, 2021, and died of natural causes in Los Angeles on February 24, 2023, at the age of 101.

Selected filmography

Bibliography

References

External links 
 Walter Mirisch Papers at the Wisconsin Center for Film and Theater Research.
 
 
 
 

1921 births
2023 deaths
20th-century American Jews
21st-century American Jews
American people of Polish-Jewish descent
Film producers from New York (state)
Producers who won the Best Picture Academy Award
Harvard Business School alumni
University of Wisconsin–Madison alumni
Presidents of the Academy of Motion Picture Arts and Sciences
Businesspeople from New York City
Golden Globe Award-winning producers
Cecil B. DeMille Award Golden Globe winners
Recipients of the Irving G. Thalberg Memorial Award
Jean Hersholt Humanitarian Award winners
Walter
DeWitt Clinton High School alumni
Men centenarians
American centenarians